Navidad may refer to:
 Nochebuena or Navidad, Christmas Eve in Spanish

Places
 Navidad, Chile, a commune in Cardenal Caro Province, O'Higgins Region, Chile
 Navidad Formation, a geological formation in Chile
 La Navidad, a settlement in what is now Haiti
 Barra de Navidad, town in the Mexican state of Jalisco
 Navidad Lake, Bolivian lake
 Navidad Bank, submerged bank in the Atlantic Ocean
 Navidad River, coastal river in the U.S. state of Texas
 Navidad mine, a large silver mine in Argentina

People with the surname
 Patricia Navidad (born 1973), Mexican singer and actress

Film
 Navidad, 2009 film by Sebastián Lelio

Music
 Navidad, oratorio by Eduardo Sánchez de Fuentes
 Navidad (Jaci Velasquez album) (2001), Spanish Christmas album by Jaci Velasquez
 Navidad (Lara & Reyes album) (2000), album released by Lara & Reyes
 Navidad (Rojo EP) (2006), Christmas music EP by the Mexican Christian rock band Rojo
 Navidades, a 2006 album by Luis Miguel
 "Navidad", a 1989 song by José Luis Perales

Other uses
 Navidad virus, a mass-mailing worm program or virus

See also
 Nativity (disambiguation)
 Feliz Navidad (disambiguation)